The 1986 Furman Paladins football team was an American football team that represented Furman University as a member of the Southern Conference (SoCon) during the 1986 NCAA Division I-AA football season. In their first year under head coach Jimmy Satterfield, the Paladins compiled an overall record of	7–3–2 with a conference mark of 4–2–1, placing third in the SoCon.

Schedule

References

Furman
Furman Paladins football seasons
Furman Paladins football